Meşəşambul is a village and municipality in the Balakan Rayon of Azerbaijan. It has a population of 3,438. The municipality consists of the villages of Meşəşambul and Qazbölük.

Notable natives 

 Ramazan Chirinqov — National Hero of Azerbaijan.
 Murad Bazarov — 2010 Youth Olympic Games winner.

References 

Populated places in Balakan District